Mateo Jesús Garralda Larumbe (born 1 December 1969) is a Spanish retired handballer and the current head coach of the Chilean national team.

He competed in the 1992 Summer Olympics, in the 1996 Summer Olympics, in the 2000 Summer Olympics, and in the 2004 Summer Olympics.

Achievements    
Liga ASOBAL:
Winner: 1993, 1994, 1996, 1997, 1998, 1999, 2002, 2005
Supercopa de España:
Winner: 1993, 1997, 1998
Copa del Rey:
Winner: 1997, 1998, 2001
Jack & Jones Ligaen:
Winner: 2009
Copa ASOBAL:
Winner: 1995, 1996
EHF Champions League:
Winner: 1994, 1996, 1997, 1998, 1999, 2001
EHF Champions Trophy:
Winner: 1996, 1997, 1998, 2000
EHF Cup Winners' Cup:
Winner: 1995, 2000, 2004
EHF Cup:
Winner: 1993
World Championship: 
Gold Medalist: 2005
European Championship: 
Silve Medalist: 1996, 1998, 2006
Bronze Medalist: 2000
Summer Olympics:
Bronze Medalist: 1996, 2000

Individual awards  
All-Star Right Back of the World Championship: 1993, 2005

Decorations  
Royal Order of Sports Merit: 2013

References

External links
Profile

1969 births
Living people
Handball players from Navarre
Spanish male handball players
Olympic handball players of Spain
Handball players at the 1992 Summer Olympics
Handball players at the 1996 Summer Olympics
Handball players at the 2000 Summer Olympics
Handball players at the 2004 Summer Olympics
Olympic medalists in handball
Olympic bronze medalists for Spain
Liga ASOBAL players
FC Barcelona Handbol players
SDC San Antonio players
CB Ademar León players
BM Granollers players
KIF Kolding players
Expatriate handball players
Spanish expatriate sportspeople in Chile
Spanish expatriate sportspeople in Denmark
Spanish expatriate sportspeople in Romania
Medalists at the 2000 Summer Olympics
Medalists at the 1996 Summer Olympics
People from Cuenca de Pamplona
Handball coaches of international teams